Benji, Zax & the Alien Prince is a live-action children's science fiction television series created by Joe Camp, the creator of the Benji film series. The series was produced by Hanna-Barbera and Mulberry Square, and it aired Saturday mornings on CBS in 1983 with repeats airing in the United States and internationally for a number of years through the 1980s. In the show, the dog Benji helps an alien prince and his droid evade various henchmen sent by a dictator to capture the prince.

The series was taped in various parts of the Dallas–Fort Worth Metroplex, with interiors taped at the Las Colinas studios in Irving, Texas. The entire series was released to DVD by GoodTimes Home Video as four separate releases of 3 or 4 episodes each and a single release with all 13 episodes.

Synopsis
A tyrant named Zanu has taken control of the distant, red planet of Antars which is "way off in another galaxy" as Yubi describes in the episode "Double Trouble" while rehearsing exactly who he is and where he comes from. Zanu has the king of Antars killed and imprisons the queen. Lisa LeMole plays the queen in the episode "Goodbye Earth." Yubi's monologue from the episode "Double Trouble" explains, "My mother is there, probably in prison. My father is dead. I have a guardian. Sorta. He's not really a person. He's a droid. Also from Antars. And those people in the black van.  You guessed it!  From Antars!"

The opening sequence of the series shows how the crown prince, their son and heir prince Yubi (played by Christopher Burton), has escaped to Earth with his droid Zax (voiced by Ric Spiegel). When Yubi and Zax land on Earth, they are befriended by a stray dog named Benji, who remains their companion for the run of the series. Two Antarian bounty hunters named Darah and Khyber, along with their droid Zord (Level 10 programing), are sent to Earth to find and to capture Yubi. Most of the plot involves Darah and Khyber chasing Benji, Zax and Yubi in a black Chevy van, and their efforts almost always end in failure, usually due to some failure of one or both of them combined with Benji's incredible intelligence and loyal assistance. There is never any doubt that Benji is a major heroic figure for this show who seems to do an often better job protecting his highness than the level 2 droid assigned to him.

In order to survive on Earth, Antarians must wear a special bracelet known as a cipher. In the episode "The Locals", Prince Yubi's cipher is stolen by a gang of boys known as "The Vikings" and he gets very sick without it. Within seconds of the cipher's removal, Yubi faints, suggesting to more observant viewers that this life support device helps Yubi to breathe in some way. This is logical since the atmosphere is likely to be very different on Antars than on Earth.  Every Antarian in the series is highly protective of their cipher, experiencing the immediate onset of fatigue as a result of its theft (Benji steals first Darah's then Khyber's cipher in the episode "Gold Mine" to force them to share a cipher and therefore rendering them unable to detect the nearby orgon signature from Trask's ship).

Beyond principal hunters Darah (Angie Bolling; episodes 1-7 and Anna Holbrook; episodes 8-13) and Khyber (Joe Rainer; episodes 1-7 and Dallas Miles; episodes 8-13), the episode "UFO" also features Ric Spiegel as hunter Harwell Thompson. The episode "Puppy Love" features Tosha Moody as Tanya, Zanu's secret threat to Prince Yubi. Burton also played T.J. Parker (an Earth boy) in the episode "Double Trouble" who shoplifted a general store, which led to Yubi being arrested due to their striking resemblance to each other, while Khyber and Darah kidnap T.J. whom they mistake for the Prince.

Characters

Main characters
Benji - The protagonist of the series. He is a stray dog who lives in Texas and befriends Yubi and Zax when they crash-land on Earth. He is very protective and caring of Yubi and comes up with ideas to evade and outsmart the two hunters sent to capture Yubi. He is referred by Antarians as a quadruped, since he walks on four legs.
Zax - A Level 2 droid assigned to Yubi. He has the ability to translate Benji and receive audio-visual signals.
Prince Yubi - A young Antarian who is forced to flee to Earth from Zanu's tyranny with Benji and Zax by their side and to avoid capture from the hunters pursuing them.

Supporting characters
Lucy - A bag lady who encounters Benji in the first episode. When Zax is damaged while being chased by the hunters, she takes him with her by mistake. She then rescues Yubi from the hunters and distracts them to give them time to escape.
Trask - An old Antarian who used to be Zanu's right-hand man. He was presumed dead when he escaped to Earth and pretended to be a man named Montana. He meets up with Yubi and offers a job to herd cattle. He explains his history with Zanu and the trio help him repair his ship to return to Antars, while Benji has the hunters distracted.
The Queen - The queen of Antars until she is overthrown and imprisoned by Zanu. She makes an appearance in the episode "Goodbye to Earth", where she sends Yubi a birthday message. Yubi gets a job at NASA in order to return to Antars until he relents and quits his job.
The King - The former king of Antars. Not much is known about him other than the fact that he was murdered by Zanu.
Mr. Stevens - A senior worker at NASA. He reluctantly hires Yubi when he wants to test his ship, who actually wants to go back home to see his mother, in spite of Zax's warnings to not endanger her wishes until he relents and quits his job until he's old enough.
Farley and BJ Matthews - A pair of fugitives who flee to a ghostown. They meet up with Yubi and come up with a plan to ransom his parents, so they can become rich with his cipher until they realize who the hunters really are. Farley is wiser than his younger brother, whereas BJ is much more paranoid and tries to warn his older brother about Zax's presence, to no avail. They tie up the hunters and tell the trio to move along before the police arrive.
Joey - A member of a local gang called "The Vikings" and the only reluctant member. He was forced by his leader, Will to steal Yubi's cipher, leaving him to become very ill without it. He eventually makes up and teams up with Benji to get Yubi's cipher back before quitting his gang.
Tanya - A young girl from Antars sent by Zanu to capture Yubi. However, she has actually grown fond of Yubi when she meets him at a skating rink. When Benji and Zax learn of this, Tanya is forced to end her relationship and abandons her mission to capture him.
Pop Wilcox - A local fisherman who hires Yubi. When he tells Yubi to get him groceries, Yubi is arrested by mistake after TJ Parker shoplifts Ross' store until Zax informs him about Yubi.
Sheriff Payton - The police chief of Rockwell County, Texas. He arrests Yubi after TJ Parker shoplifts Ross' store until Benji and Zax rescue Parker from the hunters.
Charlie Ross - A kind-hearted businessman who works at a local grocery store in Garland, Texas. He mistakes Yubi for TJ Parker until Benji and Zax rescue Parker from the hunters.
Dr. Len Janson - A veterinarian who originally worked as a World War II pilot. He is the husband of Nora and offers a job for the trio. When the hunters arrive, they gravely injure his horse, Sugarfoot and they are forced to get him to a faraway animal shelter with his plane. They eventually manage to get him to the shelter and return home.
Sugarfoot - The Jansons' black stallion. He tries to fend off the hunters chasing the trio, but ends up getting run over. Len and the trio manage to get him to a faraway shelter and the vet states that he would be home within two weeks.
RJ Jenkins - A man who finds Benji and unknowingly sells him to a greedy couple. When Yubi and Zax offer a job in exchange for Benji, the robbers break into his home and Jenkins blames Yubi until Zax informs him about the real burglars. They manage to track them down and get them arrested. Benji then gets Jenkins a white dog named Tiffany and he adopts her.
Tiffany - A female Maltese who is Benji's love interest. She appears in the episode "Benji Call Home", where she eventually gets adopted by Jenkins.

Villains
Zanu - A tyrannical warlord who takes control of Antars and overthrows Yubi's family, forcing Yubi and Zax to flee to Earth. Zanu sends his right-hand hunters, Darah and Khyber to capture Yubi and take him back. In the episode "Goldmine", it is stated by Trask that he was associated with Zanu during the revolution until he revealed his true colors and he was efforts to stop him were unsuccessful.
Darah and Khyber - Zanu's primary hunters who are the main antagonists of the series. They come to Earth to capture Yubi, but their efforts are almost unsuccessful, usually due to Benji's great intelligence and loyal assistance to Yubi. They pursue Yubi in a black chevy van and they bring a Level 10 droid named Zord for assistance.
Zord - Darah and Khyber's Level 10 droid sent by Zanu to catch Yubi. He was destroyed in the episode "Ghostown" by Benji and Zax, but was somehow revived in the later episodes. Whenever he has plans to capture Benji, he thinks about brainwashing him to have him lead them to the prince, despite Darah's protests that the brainwave manipulator is designed for humans.
Harwell Thompson - An Antarian hunter whose real motives to capture Yubi are to become rich and humiliate Darah and Khyber. He posts a fake news article about a spacecraft from Antars and kidnaps Yubi and Zax. However, Benji foils his plans by leading the hunters to his location and allowing them to escape.
The Rustlers - A pair of rustlers who try to steal Trask's cattle and break into his goldmine. However, their efforts are unsuccessful when Benji and Zax scare them away.
Will - The leader of the Vikings. He has a grudge against Benji for stealing his hot dog and offers Yubi to challenge him to beat a game. After Yubi wins, Will plans to use his cipher to become rich and Joey is forced to remove Yubi's cipher to avoid his wrath. However, Benji and Joey team up to reclaim his cipher and Joey quits the Vikings, along with the other members.
TJ Parker - A mischievous boy who resembles Yubi and shoplifts a store belonging to Charlie Ross. This results in him getting captured by the hunters and getting Yubi arrested. Oblivious about the danger, he insists on going with them until Benji and Zax rescue them and the police send him on his way to compensate Ross for his misdeeds.
Johnny and Marge Stevens - A greedy couple who buy Benji from Jenkins and rob him the next day. However, their plans are foiled when the trio track them down and get arrested.
Circon - A Level 2 droid sent by the hunters to impersonate Zax and lure Yubi into their trap. However, Benji sees under the trick, due to his lack of arachnophobia and leads him to get trapped. The hunters return and switch him back on, but Benji leads him to get shot and destroyed by the hunters by mistake.

Episode list

Sources

External links
 

1983 American television series debuts
1983 American television series endings
American children's fantasy television series
CBS original programming
1980s American children's television series
1980s American science fiction television series
American children's science fiction television series
Television shows about dogs
Television series by Hanna-Barbera
Benji
English-language television shows
Fictional trios
Live action television shows based on films
American television shows featuring puppetry
Television shows set in Texas